William Banastre (fl. 1305), was an English politician.

He was a Member (MP) of the Parliament of England for Lancashire in 1305.

References

13th-century births
14th-century deaths
English MPs 1305
Members of the Parliament of England (pre-1707) for Lancashire